Saint-Aubin-d'Aubigné (literally Saint-Aubin of Aubigné) is a commune in the Ille-et-Vilaine department in Brittany in northwestern France.

Population
Inhabitants of Saint-Aubin-d'Aubigné are called Saint-Aubinois in French.

See also
Communes of the Ille-et-Vilaine department

References

External links

Official website 

Communes of Ille-et-Vilaine